is a Japanese private railway company whose two lines run entirely in Sakyō-ku in the city of Kyoto, Kyoto Prefecture.

The present company was founded in 1985 as a subsidiary of Keifuku. The purpose of reorganization was to reduce the huge deficit of the Eiden lines, which had been completely isolated from the main Keifuku network since the abandonment of the Kyoto City Tramways in 1978. The split-off was considered to be an urgent matter, awaiting the completion of a long-awaited rail connection between the two networks of Eiden and Keihan. The Keihan Electric Railway was at that time constructing the Ōtō Line to the Eiden terminal at Demachiyanagi. The opening of the Ōtō Line significantly reduced the deficit of Eiden. Later on, in 2002, all shares of Keifuku were transferred from Keifuku to Keihan, of which Eiden became a wholly owned subsidiary. This railway accepts the Surutto Kansai card for payment, but not the PiTaPa card.

The line is featured in the Japanese Rail Sim 3D: Journey to Kyoto train simulation game for the Nintendo 3DS and Nintendo Switch.

Lines
 Eizan Main Line
Demachiyanagi — Yase-Hieizanguchi: 5.6 km
 Kurama Line
Takaragaike — Kurama: 8.8 km

Rolling stock
For service
"Deo 700" series "Deo 710" type, "Deo 720" type, "Deo 730" type 1-car
"Deo 800" series 2-car
"Deo 900" series 2-car named "Kirara"
"Deo 600" type 2-car
For maintenance
"Deto 1000" type

See also
List of railway companies in Japan

References

External links 
 Official website

Railway companies of Japan
Rail transport in Kyoto Prefecture
Railway companies established in 1985
600 V DC railway electrification
Companies based in Kyoto
1985 establishments in Japan